Stephen D. Penny Jr. (born 1964) is an American businessman and sports administrator. Penny was president and CEO of USA Gymnastics from April 4, 2005, to March 16, 2017, and is a key figure in the USA Gymnastics sex abuse scandal.

Career
Penny began his career in sports as a marketing and promotions assistant for the Seattle Mariners. His other employment has included work in the travel and tourism industries.

Penny has been active within the Olympic movement since joining Turner Broadcasting in 1989 as a research manager for the 1990 Goodwill Games. In 1991, Penny became the director of media and public relations for USA Cycling and eventually became managing director of the United States Cycling Federation, which oversaw the amateur road and track cycling disciplines. Penny left USA Cycling in 1996, returning to his hometown of Seattle to become Vice President of Bob Walsh Enterprises, focused on business development in conjunction with sports marketing, events, media and consulting.

USA Gymnastics
Penny joined USA Gymnastics in March 1999 as the Senior Vice President, overseeing a variety of areas focused on business development. Within a few years, his responsibilities grew to oversee the marketing, sponsorship, event operations, television and communications, including the management of the 2003 World Artistic Gymnastics Championships in Anaheim, California.

Penny was accused by former Olympic gymnast Dominique Moceanu of being at the forefront of USA Gymnastics ignoring the abuse of gymnasts. She called for his resignation. USA Gymnastics responded by saying that Penny was a leader in ensuring the safety and well-being of USA Gymnastics gymnasts.

While being questioned under oath, Penny testified that USA Gymnastics rarely forwarded allegations of child abuse to police or child protective services without being asked because of a belief that there was not a duty to report abuse if USA Gymnastics was a third party to abuse allegations and concern about damaging a coach's reputation if an abuse allegation was false. USA Gymnastics dismissed complaints as hearsay unless they were signed by an alleged abuse victim or a victim's parent. Officials of USA Gymnastics—which is headquartered in Indiana—may have violated Indiana state law by failing to report abuse allegations.

Penny resigned from USA Gymnastics on March 16, 2017.

After USA Gymnastics
When Penny testified before Congress in June 2018 he invoked his fifth amendment rights to avoid answering questions, leading to a cry of shame from one onlooker.

On October 17, 2018, the United States Marshals Smoky Mountains Fugitive Task Force arrested Penny. He is alleged to have tampered with evidence during the investigation of sexual assaults against Larry Nassar. The indictment further alleges that Penny ordered the removal of the documents from the Karolyi Ranch that were related to the activities of Nassar. If convicted, Penny would have faced a punishment of 2 to 10 years in prison and up to a $10,000 fine.

Evidence tampering charges against Penny have since been dismissed. A dismissal letter filed on April 14, 2022 claimed the following - "there is now insufficient evidence to prosecute according to current law and facts present in the case."

The day following his arrest, USA Gymnastics placed Penny on its "permanently ineligible" list of members "per the provisions in SafeSport Code for the U.S. Olympic and Paralympic Movement, III.A.4, and USA Gymnastics Bylaw 10.14(b)."

Personal life
Penny graduated from the University of Washington in 1987, previously attending Mercer Island High School. He has three daughters, triplets born in 2005.

Penny is a central figure in the 2020 film Athlete A, a documentary about the USA Gymnastics sex abuse scandal.

References

1964 births
21st-century American businesspeople
Living people
People from Mercer Island, Washington
University of Washington alumni